The 2011-2012 season was the 16th edition of the Lebanese Basketball League. The regular season began on Saturday, October 22, 2011 and ended on Friday April 20, 2012. The playoffs began on Thursday, April 26 and ended with the 2012 Finals on Sunday May 13, 2012, after Champville SC defeated Anibal Zahle in 4 games to win their first title (new format).

Regular season

Standings 

 Chabibet Haouch El Oumara withdrew in the 7th round

Final 8

Playoffs

Brackets

Statistics leaders

Awards 
 Player of the Year: Fadi El Khatib, Champville SC
 Guard of the Year: Austin Johnson, Mouttahed Tripoli
 Forward of the Year: Fadi El Khatib, Champville SC
 Center of the Year: Samuel Hoskin, Champville SC
 Newcomer of the Year: Samuel Hoskin, Champville SC
 Import of the Year: Samuel Hoskin, Champville SC
 Domestic Player of the Year: Fadi El Khatib, Champville SC
 Defensive Player of the Year: Ismail Ahmad, Riyadi Beirut
 First Team:
 G: Austin Johnson, Mouttahed Tripoli
 F: Desmond Penigar, Byblos Club
 F: Fadi El Khatib, Champville SC
 F: Ismail Ahmad, Riyadi Beirut
 F/C: Samuel Hoskin, Champville SC
 Second Team:
 PG: Rodrigue Akl, Anibal Zahle
 G: Jasmon Youngblood, Anibal Zahle
 F/G: Jean AbdelNour, Riyadi Beirut
 F/C: Bassel Bawji, Mouttahed Tripoli 
 C: Joe Vogel, Riyadi Beirut

Lebanese Basketball Cup 
On May 22, 2012, Anibal Zahle defeated Hoops Club in the finals of the cup.

Anibal Zahle reached the Final after beating the newly crowned Lebanese Basketball League champions Champville SC in the Semifinals. As for Hoops Club they reached this stage after winning against Riyadi Beirut by forfeit due to the decision taken by the Riyadi administration.

References
Asia-basket.com statistics

2011–12
League
Lebanese